is a crushing tool used in phytotherapy in Japan. It uses a wheel which is rolled back and forth to crush ingredients.

Herbalism